Idea idea, or Linnaeus' idea, is a large butterfly that belongs to the danaid group of the family Nymphalidae. It was described by Carl Linnaeus in his 1763 Centuria Insectorum. It is found in the Australasian realm.

Subspecies
I. i. idea (Ambon, Serang)
I. i. aza (Boisduval, 1832) (Buru)
I. i. sula (de Nicéville, 1900) (Sula Islands)

References

External links
"Idea Fabricius, 1807" at Markku Savela's Lepidoptera and Some Other Life Forms

Butterflies described in 1763
Idea (butterfly)
Butterflies of Indonesia
Taxa named by Carl Linnaeus